Templeton railway station served the village of Templeton, Pembrokeshire, Wales, from 1877 to 1964 on the Pembroke and Tenby Railway.

History 
The station was opened as Templeton Platform in October 1877 by the Pembroke and Tenby Railway, although there is evidence of trains stopping before the station was built in 1867. It was then only used for market trains until it appeared in the timetable in October 1877. It was initially open on Fridays and Saturdays only but it opened every day on 1 May 1906. 'Platform' was dropped from its name in 1905. The station closed on 15 June 1964.

References 

Disused railway stations in Pembrokeshire
Beeching closures in Wales
Railway stations in Great Britain opened in 1877
Railway stations in Great Britain closed in 1964
1867 establishments in Wales
1964 disestablishments in Wales